Psammophis lineolatus, commonly known as steppe ribbon racer or arrow snake, is a species of Mildly venomous snake (Not Harmful for Humans) in the family Lamprophiidae. It is located in northern and central Asia, from north western China, Mongolia, Russia, Kazakhstan, Azerbaijan, Kyrgyzstan, Tajikistan, Turkmenistan, Uzbekistan, Afghanistan, Iran, and Pakistan. This snake has not been evaluated for conservation globally, but in Mongolia, it is categorized as Least Concern due to its large range and the fact that no decline in population has been detected.

Description
The total length of the body reaches 91 cm. The front end of the muzzle is bluntly rounded. The narrow head slightly separated from the neck. The frontal shield is long and very narrow. The upper surface of the muzzle is concave or with a longitudinal groove. The cheekbone shield is long and narrow. There are 17 smooth scales around the middle of the body. The pupil is large. The anal flap divided. The tail is short. The color of the upper side of the body is olive-gray, sandy or brownish-gray; the edges of the scales are slightly lighter than their middle. Along the body are 4 dark longitudinal stripes with black edges, sometimes absent or are only narrow, sometimes dotted stripes. The stripes begin on the head shields. The belly is white with grayish, brownish or olive-grey spots, which in some cases merge into a continuous stripe running through the middle of the anterior third of the body.

Reproduction
The arrow snake is an oviparous. Mating occurs in May and June. The female lays 3-11 strongly elongated eggs 30-55 mm long and 7.5—15 mm wide in late June and July. Young snakes with a body length of 25-330 mm appear in late July or August.

References

 Ананьева Н. Б., Боркин Л. Я., Даревский И. С., Орлов Н. Л. Пятиязычный словарь названий животных. Амфибии и рептилии. Латинский, русский, английский, немецкий, французский. / под общей редакцией акад. В. Е. Соколова. — М.: Рус. яз., 1988. — С. 322. — 10 500 экз.
 Venchi, Alberto and Roberto Sindaco 2006. Annotated checklist of the reptiles of the Mediterranean countries, with keys to species identification. Part 2 -Snakes (Reptilia, Serpentes). Annali del Museo Civico di Storia Naturale «G. Doria», Genova, XCVIII: 259—364
 Baig, KJ, Masroor, R., and Arshad, M. 2008. Biodiversity and ecology of the herpetofauna of Cholistan Desert, Pakistan. Russian Journal of Herpetology 15 (3): 193—205

Psammophis
Reptiles of Russia
Reptiles of China
Reptiles of Iran
Taxa named by Johann Friedrich von Brandt
Reptiles described in 1838